Blindsided may refer to:

Film and TV
Blindsided (1993 film), directed by Tom Donnelly with Jeff Fahey, Mia Sara, Rudy Ramos 
Blindsided, alternate title of Penthouse North (2013)  Michelle Monaghan, Michael Keaton,
Blindsided, the third episode of the eighth season of the American sitcom Modern Family
Blindsided (2017 film), directed by Louis Mandylor

Music
Blindsided (album), by Axium
Blindsided, album by Blindside Blues Band  
"Blindsided", song by Lucy Woodward
"Blindsided", song by Bon Iver, released as part of the For Emma, Forever Ago album

Other
Blindsided, novel by Fern Michaels
Blindsided, a non-fiction book by Jim Ferraro